Rafiq Ghaznavi  (1907 –  March 2, 1974) was a British Indian musician and actor,  known for his contributions in Abdul Rashid Kardar's Heer Ranjha (1932) film, Mehboob Khan's Taqdeer (1943), film Ek Din Ka Sultan (1945) among others.
He was educated at Islamia College, Lahore.

Rafiq Ghaznavi's ancestors originally comes from Ghazni, Afghanistan. After partition of India in 1947, he migrated to Lahore, Pakistan. Later, he moved to Karachi, Pakistan. In Pakistan, he composed music for director Ashfaq Malik's film Parwaaz (1954) and director Aziz Ahmed's film Mandi (1956).
He later joined Radio Pakistan and dedicated himself exclusively to Radio programs as a music director.

He died in Karachi at the age of 67 on 2 March 1974.

References

External links

Rare Pictures of Rafiq Ghaznavi by Rashid Ashraf

1907 births
1974 deaths
20th-century Indian male singers
20th-century Indian singers
Pakistani playback singers
Pakistani male film actors
Indian male film actors
20th-century Pakistani male singers
Pakistani composers
Radio personalities from Karachi
Pakistani radio personalities